Herbert Hunt "Flash" Covington (October 16, 1902 – January 1, 1990), also called "The Mayfield Flash", was an American football, basketball, and baseball player for the Centre Praying Colonels of Centre College in Danville, Kentucky.

Early years
Covington spent a year at Mayfield High and two at Castle Heights Military Academy.

Centre College

Football
Covington was a prominent running back for coaches Charley Moran and Robert L. Myers's Centre Colonels from 1921 to 1924,  chosen as a running back on Centre's all-time football team in 1935.

1921
Covington played at halfback during the 6–0 victory over Harvard. Bo McMillin threw a touchdown to Covington in the 1922 Dixie Classic which Centre lost to Texas A&M.

1922
Taking over for McMillin at quarterback the following season, Covington did not miss a minute of play over the next three years. He was selected All-Southern in 1922. That year Covington kicked a then record six straight drop-kicked field goals in the victory over Louisville. In a rematch with Harvard, a 24 to 10 loss, "Covington, the Centre quarterback, was responsible for most of the scoring in the game; he kicked Centre's goal from the field, and through Roberts's assistance, made Centre's touchdown; his errors led to the Harvard scores also." He was  selected All-American in 1922 by Billy Evans and was on Norman E. Brown's second team. In 1924 he was selected as a third-team All-American by Davis J. Walsh of the International News Service. Athletic trainer Alfred Doneghy said Covington was the best runner Centre ever had.

An account of his six field goal record follows:

"Herb Covington, who has shattered records galore this season through his ground gaining ability, established a world record today for field goals by drop kicks in a single game. Six times he booted the oval over the crossbar, three of them from the 30 yard mark and one from the 41 yard line. The others were from between the 30 and 40 yard marks. The record previously was held by B. W. Tafford, Harvard, and W. H. Eckersall, University of Chicago, jointly with five in a single game. Robertson of Purdue made seven goals in a game with Rose Poly in 1900, but they were all from placement."

1924
Centre defeated Georgia 14 to 7 and Wallace Wade's Alabama and claims a Southern championship.

Marriage
He married Eleanor Blanche McCormick of Senatobia, Mississippi, and was a realtor in Florida.

Coaching career
Covington was coach of the Hillsborough High School Terriers in Tampa in 1925. Jimmy Steele was on the team.

References

American football quarterbacks
Centre College people
Centre Colonels baseball players
Centre Colonels football players
Sportspeople from Kentucky
Players of American football from Kentucky
People from Mayfield, Kentucky
1902 births
All-Southern college football players
American football halfbacks
American football drop kickers
1990 deaths
High school football coaches in Florida
20th-century American people